Rudolf-Tonn-Stadion, (Schwechat-Rannerdorf) is a multi-use-stadium in Rannersdorf, a city subdivision of Schwechat, Austria.
The stadium seats 7000 with additional room for standing spectators around the playing field.

History 
The stadium is the home ground of SV Schwechat and Karabakh Wien. Named after the former mayor of Schwechat Rudolf Tonn. The opening match was FK Austria Wien vs. First Vienna FC. It has also occasionally played host to Austrian Football League matches and track and field athletics.

References

External links 
 Images of the Rudolf-Tonn-Stadion 

Football venues in Austria
Sports venues in Lower Austria
Schwechat
FC Mauerwerk
SV Schwechat